Kënga Magjike 05 took place in the Palace of Congresses in Tirana, Albania. There were two semifinals (21 & 22 November 2003) and a final (23 November 2003). 31 songs competed for the win but only 17 made it to the final. In the end, Ema Bytyçi won the first prize. Aleksandër Gjoka was the runner-up. The number of points for each singer was announced by each jury member.

Results

Voting procedure 

The jury voted based on a point system for most of the prizes, while the televote determined the "Public's Prize".

Jury 

 President Of The Jury: Afërdita Saraçini Klemendi

The jury this year was made up of all female members.

Other prizes

Orchestra 

Playback was used.

Guest artists 

 Nathalie Arts
 Kim Lucas

Staff 

 Organizer: Ardit Gjebrea
 Director: Vera Grabocka

Sources 
 http://www.kengamagjike.com
 http://muzika.albasoul.com/terejat.php?id=1267

2003
2003 in Albania